Colin Graham (born 26 January 1958) is a former Australian rules footballer who played with Melbourne in the Victorian Football League (VFL).

Notes

External links 
		

1958 births
Living people
Australian rules footballers from South Australia
Melbourne Football Club players
Kyabram Football Club players
Indigenous Australian players of Australian rules football